William Gerard Barry (1864 in Ballyadam, Carrigtwohill – 9 September 1941) was an Irish painter.

Career

The son of a magistrate, Barry was born in Ballyadam, Carrigtwohill, County Cork. He enrolled in Cork's Crawford School of Art and studied there under Henry Jones Thaddeus from 1881 to 1883. Thaddeus advised Barry to travel to Paris where he continued his training at Académie Julian under Le Febre, Boulanger and Carolus Duran. His initial success came in 1887 when he received a £30 Taylor prize after sending a painting to the Royal Dublin Society from Étaples. He traveled extensively, including visits to the United States and Canada. Barry was living in Saint-Jean-de-Luz, in southwest France during the German occupation of World War II. He died when a bomb went off near his home on 9 September 1941.

References

External links
Barry's Time Flies painting and Bio

1864 births
1941 deaths
19th-century Irish painters
20th-century Irish painters
Irish male painters
Académie Julian alumni
Alumni of Cork Institute of Technology
Deaths by airstrike during World War II
Irish civilians killed in World War II
Irish expatriates in France
People from County Cork
19th-century Irish male artists
20th-century Irish male artists